La Guzmán: Primera Fila is a live album released by Alejandra Guzmán on December 3, 2013.

Track listing

Singles

Tour
To support the album, Guzmán launched the "La Guzman 1F Tour", which included dates in the United States, at Los Angeles, Las Vegas, Houston, Miami and Puerto Rico.

Charts

Certification

References

2013 live albums
Alejandra Guzmán live albums
Pop rock albums by Mexican artists
Primera Fila albums
Sony Music Latin live albums
Spanish-language live albums